Sylvichadsia is a genus of flowering plants in the legume family, Fabaceae. It belongs to the subfamily Faboideae.

References 

Millettieae
Fabaceae genera